Jhon Kennedy Hurtado Valencia (born May 16, 1984) is a Colombian footballer who last played for Chivas USA in Major League Soccer.

Career

Professional
Hurtado began his career in the youth ranks of Deportivo Cali. In 2004, he began his professional career with Unión Magdalena, and  since went on to appear in 121 matches at the first and second division levels in Colombia. In 2005 Hurtado played for Monagas in the Primera División Venezolana. The following season, he returned to Colombia signing with Centauros. In 2007, Hurtado played for Expreso Rojo and Real Cartagena of the Colombian Categoría Primera B, while in 2008 he played for Deportivo Cali.

Known for his incredible pace, Hurtado had a trial at Italian giants Milan, and played a friendly against German side Hannover, prior to signing with Major League Soccer expansion side Seattle Sounders FC on loan from Cali. “Jhon has good speed, he’s a good man-to-man marker, a good tackler and uses his speed to close people down,” said Sounders FC technical director Chris Henderson. “We had a chance to see him play 2-3 times, plus some video. We’re excited to have him join our team.” Hurtado made his MLS debut on March 19 where he started in Seattle's first ever game, which Seattle won 3-0 defeating the New York Red Bulls. On May 16, 2009 Hurtado celebrated his 25th birthday by scoring his first MLS goal in a 1-1 draw at FC Dallas. On February 16, 2010, Hurtado signed a permanent deal with Seattle Sounders FC. He made a total of 108 league appearances for the club, scoring one goal, before leaving the club in the winter of 2014. During his time in Seattle the club captured the U.S. Open Cup three consecutive years.

On January 15, 2014 Hurtado was traded from the Seattle Sounders to the Chicago Fire along with Patrick Ianni and the 13th overall pick in the 2014 MLS SuperDraft. In return, the Sounders acquired Jalil Anibaba, the 8th overall pick in the 2014 MLS Superdraft, and a conditional pick in the 2015 MLS SuperDraft from Chicago. After appearing in 19 matches as a starter for Chicago, Hurtado was traded to Chivas USA on August 22, 2014 in exchange for allocation money.

On December 4, 2015, it was announced that he was given a trial with Major League Soccer side New York City FC.

Personal life
Hurtado is married to wife Daysury with whom he has one child named Paolo, born on June 19, 2009. Following the birth of Paolo, Hurtado missed the Seattle Sounders versus the New York Red Bulls game. Hurtado and his wife watched the match as Fredy Montero and Osvaldo Alonso celebrated Paolo's birth via t-shirt messages. Montero and Hurtado are good friends who first met while playing for Deportivo Cali. They often carpooled to work.

Hurtado was granted a U.S. green card in December 2010. This status qualifies him as a domestic player for MLS roster purposes.

Honours

Seattle Sounders FC
Lamar Hunt U.S. Open Cup (3): 2009, 2010, 2011

References

External links

1984 births
Living people
Association football defenders
Colombian footballers
Colombian expatriate footballers
Unión Magdalena footballers
Monagas S.C. players
Centauros Villavicencio footballers
Tigres F.C. footballers
Real Cartagena footballers
Deportivo Cali footballers
Seattle Sounders FC players
Chicago Fire FC players
Chivas USA players
Expatriate footballers in Venezuela
Expatriate soccer players in the United States
Major League Soccer players
Major League Soccer All-Stars
People from Palmira, Valle del Cauca
Sportspeople from Valle del Cauca Department